Ptilocera is a genus of flies in the family Stratiomyidae.

Species
Ptilocera amethystina Snellen van Vollenhoven, 1857
Ptilocera aureopilosa Mason & Rozkošný, 2011
Ptilocera bergi James, 1948
Ptilocera continua Walker, 1851
Ptilocera fastuosa Gerstaecker, 1857
Ptilocera flavispina Yang, Zhang & Li, 2014
Ptilocera kerteszi Mason & Rozkošný, 2011
Ptilocera lateralis Macquart, 1846
Ptilocera latiscutella Yang, Zhang & Li, 2014
Ptilocera paradisea Lindner, 1951
Ptilocera quadridentata (Fabricius, 1805)
Ptilocera simplex Mason & Rozkošný, 2011
Ptilocera smaragdifera Walker, 1859
Ptilocera smaragdina Walker, 1849
Ptilocera violacea Edwards, 1915

References

Stratiomyidae
Brachycera genera
Taxa named by Christian Rudolph Wilhelm Wiedemann
Diptera of Asia
Diptera of Australasia